Hard Candy is a 2005 American psychological thriller film focusing on a 14-year-old female vigilante's trapping and torture of a man whom she suspects of being a sexual predator. The film was directed by David Slade, written by Brian Nelson, and stars Elliot Page and Patrick Wilson. It was the first feature film for Slade, who had primarily directed music videos.

Hard Candy premiered at the 2005 Sundance Film Festival, and was screened at the Florida Film Festival in April 2006. It had a limited release in two theaters in the United States. The film made over $8 million at the box office, including $1 million domestically, on a budget of under $1 million.

Hard Candy won three awards at the 2005 Sitges Film Festival, four awards at the Málaga Film Festival, and was also awarded Overlooked Film of the Year at the 2006 Phoenix Film Critics Society Awards. Page won Best Actress at the 2006 Austin Film Critics Association Awards.

Plot
14-year-old Hayley Stark and 32-year-old photographer Jeff Kohlver engage in a sexually charged, flirtatious online chat. They then meet at a coffeehouse before going to Jeff's home. When they arrive, Jeff makes them drinks, but Hayley refuses by saying she was taught to never take a drink she has not mixed herself. Hayley goes to the kitchen and makes them both screwdrivers. As Jeff shows her around his house, she notes the photographs hung on his walls, all of which seem to be of underage half clothed girls. Hayley asks Jeff to photograph her. He gets out his camera and Hayley begins to pose but before Jeff can take any photos, he loses consciousness.

When Jeff wakes, he is bound to a desk chair. Hayley explains she has been tracking and baiting him through online chats and drugged him because she believes he is a sexual predator and murderer. Jeff denies these allegations, claiming he had innocent intentions. Hayley searches Jeff's house and finds a gun and a safe. In the safe, Hayley finds pictures, including a photo of Donna Mauer, a local girl who has been kidnapped and remains missing. Jeff continues to deny the accusations and kicks Hayley to the ground, temporarily knocking her out. He rolls the chair into his bedroom and manages to retrieve his gun, which Hayley left out on his bed. He returns to the living room to see that Hayley is no longer there; she comes up from behind him and wraps his face in plastic wrap, choking him unconscious.

When Jeff wakes, he finds himself bound to a steel table with a bag of ice on his genitals, making them numb. Hayley tells him that she intends to castrate him. Jeff attempts to dissuade her, including by telling her he was abused as a child in a play for sympathy, but fails. Hayley consults a medical book to guide her through the procedure, describing it to Jeff as she performs the operation. Once it is finished, Hayley puts down the scalpel and walks away, saying she needs a shower.

Jeff frees himself, only to realize that the "surgery" was a trick and he is unharmed. He picks up the scalpel and storms into the bathroom, where the shower is running. He slashes at the shower curtain, but finds the shower empty. Hayley attacks him from behind, and as they struggle, Hayley incapacitates him with a stun gun.

Hayley calls Jeff's ex-girlfriend Janelle and, posing as a police officer, asks her to come immediately to Jeff's house. Jeff regains consciousness to find that Hayley has bound his wrists and hoisted him to stand on a chair in his kitchen with a noose around his neck. Hayley makes Jeff an offer: if he commits suicide, she promises to erase the evidence of his crimes, but if he refuses, she will expose his secrets. The conversation is interrupted when a neighbor knocks on the front door, selling Girl Scout cookies. When Hayley returns, Jeff breaks from his bindings and pursues her to the roof of his house. Hayley has brought her rope from the kitchen and fashioned it into a noose secured to the chimney. Hayley keeps Jeff at bay with his gun.

Jeff confesses that he watched while another man raped and murdered Mauer. Jeff promises Hayley that, if she spares his life, he will tell her the other man's name so she can exact her revenge. Hayley reveals that she already knows his name, Aaron, and that Aaron said Jeff did it before he killed himself. Janelle arrives, and Hayley once again urges Jeff to hang himself, promising that she will destroy the evidence. Defeated, Jeff lets Hayley slide the noose around his neck, and steps off the roof. After he falls, Hayley says "Or not"; – then gathers her belongings and walks away through the woods.

Cast
 Patrick Wilson as Jeff Kohlver
 Elliot Page as Hayley Stark
 Sandra Oh as Judy Tokuda
 Jennifer Holmes as Janelle Rogers
 Gilbert John as Nighthawks Clerk

Production
The idea for Hard Candy came from a news story producer David W. Higgins saw on 20/20 about young Japanese girls who would lure older businessmen to a location with the promise of meaningful conversation, only to assault and mug the men with a gang of other girls. This led him to wonder, "What if the person you expect to be the predator is not who you expect it to be? What if it's the other person?" He shared this question with writer Brian Nelson who worked out a treatment and then a script on spec, and then Higgins and Nelson approached David Slade to direct. Due to the controversial nature of the work, the budget was kept under $1 million so that the production company would not ask to change anything.

Very little dubbing was used in the film, with only a couple of lines modified in post-production. Only nine minutes of music are present in the film, with ambient sounds, such as heavy breathing, making up most of the soundtrack. The film was shot in 18 days, largely in sequence, and mostly on a soundstage. Hayley wears a red hooded sweatshirt that is often seen as an allusion to "Little Red Riding Hood". However, this was a serendipitous wardrobe choice by the creative team that was not realized until later on. International marketing for the film made  use of this allusion. For example, a tagline on the Japanese site for the film reads: "Red Hood traps the Wolf in his own game."

Jean-Clement Soret was the digital colorist for the film, this being one of the few instances in which a colorist received a spot in the opening credits. The film contains many coloring effects and "density shifts" of lighting to reflect the moods of the characters. For example, when Hayley gets angry, the colors would be edited to be of lower frequency. One effect used which, as far as the director is aware, had not been done in cinema before, was to brighten the lighting in filming and correct everything down in post-production. This allowed for facial details to be visible even while having a darkened atmosphere. According to the DVD extras, the process required a custom-built digital intermediate to be made and proved to be extremely difficult, with corrections having to be made frame-by-frame in some instances. This technique, known as ETTR, is a standard procedure in digital photography and cinematography to minimize the amount of noise in shadows and midtones.

Nelson's early working titles of the script were Vendetta and Snip Snip. When Higgins asked for a title with a "sugar and spice combination and a mixture of harsh roughness, innocence, and vulnerability", Nelson proposed the title Hard Candy.

Reception

Box office
The film premiered at the 2005 Sundance Film Festival with a midnight screening. The Dolby Surround System failed before the screening and the audience was kept out until it was repaired. Hard Candy was also screened at the Florida Film Festival on April 1, 2006.

Hard Candy opened in two theaters in Los Angeles and New York City on April 14, 2006 in a limited release. During its opening weekend, the film grossed $58,049 averaging $29,704 per theater, the highest per-screen average in the top 50. Box Office Mojo reported that it ended its run with $1,024,640 at the North American box office, and a further $5,997,569 internationally for a total of $7,022,209. The Numbers put the total gross at $8.26 million, with an international gross of $7,242,426.

Critical response
On review aggregator Rotten Tomatoes, 67% of 147 critic reviews are positive, and the average rating is 6.4/10. The critics consensus reads: "Disturbing, controversial, but entirely engrossing, Hard Candy is well written with strong lead performances, especially that of newcomer Elliot Page. A movie that stays with the viewer long after leaving the theater." According to Metacritic, which sampled 30 reviews and calculated a weighted average score of 58 out of 100, the film received "mixed or average reviews".

Roger Ebert rated the film 3.5/4 stars, writing "There is undeniable fascination in the situation as it unfolds... Seen as a film, seen as acting and direction, seen as just exactly how it unfolds on the screen, Hard Candy is impressive and effective." Steve Persall wrote in the Tampa Bay Times that he saw the movie in a crowded bar, yet "until the shocking end, there's nothing less than rapt attention to this sordid thriller about an online predator (Wilson) and his not-so-innocent prey [Elliot Page]. On a party night in New Orleans? That's how creepy-good this movie is." Steve Schneider, writing in the Orlando Weekly, praised the film's "grabber of a sicko setup... It's a memorably tense pas de deux, and if the movie doesn't pay off on it properly, fault a script that ventures further and further into psychological thriller claptrap, leaving the two stars to rely on their hefty talents to keep it at all believable."

Caroline Westbrook at Empire magazine called it a "cracking little thriller". David Edwards at the Daily Mirror praised it as a "smart, challenging and timely look at the world of internet grooming". Todd McCarthy at Variety praised the "spectacular performance" by the teenaged Page. On the other hand, Jonathan Rosenbaum referred to it as torture and mutilation and wrote: "I'd rather have this movie obliterated from my memory." The New York Times film critic Manohla Dargis recognized the film's debt to "Ariel Dorfman and Neil LaBute, among others", but did not care for the torture theme "in the age of Abu Ghraib".

Page's performance received critical acclaim; Lynn Hirschberg of The New York Times Magazine said "a star was born, but almost no one noticed", describing Hard Candy as Page's initial artistic breakthrough performance, and his role in the 2007 film Juno as his mainstream popularity breakthrough performance. Claudia Puig from USA Today praised him for "remain[ing] consistently convincing" to his role which is both "powerful and chilling ... he manages to be both cruelly callous and likable, and [his] is one of the most complex, disturbing and haunting performances of the year."

Accolades 
The film won three awards at the 2005 Sitges Film Festival and four awards at the 2006 Málaga Film Festival. The film also won Overlooked Film of the Year at the 2006 Phoenix Film Critics Society Awards. Page won the Best Actress award from the Austin Film Critics Association. Page was nominated for the Breakthrough Performer award at the 2006 Online Film Critics Society Awards, and Best Female Newcomer at the 12th Empire Awards. The film was nominated for Best Foreign Independent film at the 2006 British Independent Film Awards, and the film's trailer was nominated for Best Thriller and Best Titles in a Trailer at the 7th Golden Trailer Awards.

Home media
The American DVD was released on September 19, 2006, with two commentary tracks, a 52-minute making-of featurette, six deleted and extended scenes, the script and director's notebook, and trailers for Hard Candy and other Lionsgate films. Francis Rizzo III from DVD Talk gave a positive review, praising the DVD's quality and extras. The Blu-ray was released by Lionsgate Home Entertainment on October 5, 2010, and contained the same special features as the DVD. Aaron Peck from High-Def Digest and Jeffrey Kauffman from Blu-ray.com both awarded the Blu-ray four out of five stars.

Notes

References

External links

 
 
 
 
 
 October 19, 2003 draft script

2005 films
2005 independent films
2005 psychological thriller films
American independent films
American psychological thriller films
2005 directorial debut films
2000s English-language films
Films about kidnapping
Films about child sexual abuse
Films directed by David Slade
Films set in Los Angeles
Films shot in Los Angeles
Home invasions in film
Lionsgate films
American vigilante films
Vulcan Productions films
2000s vigilante films
Obscenity controversies in film
2000s American films